Richard Hoepfner (born November 14, 1944) is an American sailor. He won a silver medal in the Soling Class with John Kolius and Walter Glasgow at the 1976 Summer Olympics. Hoepfner was born in Houston, Texas.

References
 

1944 births
Living people
American male sailors (sport)
Medalists at the 1976 Summer Olympics
North American Champions Soling
Olympic silver medalists for the United States in sailing
People from Houston
Sailors at the 1976 Summer Olympics – Soling